This is a list of Royal Observer Corps Monitoring Post and United Kingdom Warning and Monitoring Organisation civil defence posts for monitoring aircraft operating over Great Britain. This list has been split into:

 List of ROC Group Headquarters and UKWMO Sector controls
 List of Royal Observer Corps / United Kingdom Warning and Monitoring Organisation Posts (A–E)
 List of Royal Observer Corps / United Kingdom Warning and Monitoring Organisation Posts (F–K)
 List of Royal Observer Corps / United Kingdom Warning and Monitoring Organisation Posts (L–P)
 List of Royal Observer Corps / United Kingdom Warning and Monitoring Organisation Posts (Q–Z)

See also

External links
Nuclear Monitoring Posts – Subterranea Britannica

 *
1925 establishments in the United Kingdom
Military units and formations established in 1941
Military units and formations disestablished in 1995
Obs
Operation Overlord
World War II sites in the United Kingdom
Cold War military equipment of the United Kingdom
Cold War military history of the United Kingdom

no:Royal Observer Corps